The 7th Cinema Express Awards were held on 12 April 1987, and honoured the best of South Indian films released in 1986. The awards were announced in February.

Tamil

Telugu

Kannada

Malayalam

Special awards 
Radha Ravi and Ambika were given separate special awards for Odangal and Natpu, and Thazhuvatha Kaigal, respectively.

Notes

References 

1987 Indian film awards
Cinema Express Awards